Xiomara Getrouw (born 22 October 1994) is a Surinamese swimmer. She competed in the women's 50 metre backstroke event at the 2017 World Aquatics Championships.

References

1994 births
Living people
Surinamese female swimmers
Sportspeople from Paramaribo
Female backstroke swimmers